Located at the corner of St. Pierre and St. Paul streets and first known as the "City Tavern," kept by Robert Tesseyman, this 19th-century hotel in Montreal, Quebec, Canada, was a popular meeting place of the Beaver Club before later becoming the Exchange Coffee House. In 1805, Samuel Gerrard proposed building Nelson's Column, Montreal here. The hotel was a common place of rest for transient travellers and Upper Canada merchants. It became the location of the first stock transactions in Montreal.

Time Line 
 1832 - The hotel becomes the location of the first stock transactions to take place in Montreal, and perhaps Canada.
 1874 - The Montreal Stock Exchange becomes Chartered after more than 40 years of informal trading, mostly in railroad and bank securities.
 1883 - The Exchange moves to the Commodities Exchange building on St. Sacrament Street. Trading hours are from 10:45 a.m. to 3:00 p.m.
 1904 - The Exchange moves into its own building, at 453 St. François-Xavier Street in Old Montreal. Today home to the Centaur Theatre, this building was designed by architect George B. Post who also designed the New York Stock Exchange Building.

External links
 Montreal in 1816
 Montreal Exchange (MX) Historical Highlights

References 

History of Montreal
Old Montreal
Hotels in Montreal
Defunct hotels in Canada